Antipodromia is a monotypic genus of fly from New Zealand that was first described by Plant in 2011.

References

External links

Empididae
Monotypic Diptera genera
Diptera of New Zealand